International Boxing Federation Muaythai (or IBF Muaythai) is commissioned under the jurisdiction of the International Boxing Federation (IBF) as a non-profit organization to regulate, control and supervise professional Muay Thai events worldwide.

History
The International Boxing Federation had their "1st Annual Convention of IBF Muaythai" in Bangkok, Thailand on 20-21, December 2017, and IBF muaythai was announced its formation on December 21, 2017.

Daryl J. Peoples, IBF president, attended the convention. The new champions of IBF Muay Thai were crowned in 3 weight divisions, Pinklao Bangkoknoivillage  at welterweight, Seksan Aor.Kwanmuang at lightweight,  Petchaouthong Aor. Kwanmaung at Junior lightweight.

They organized their first fights at the Rajadamnern Stadium during the Stadium's 73rd Anniversary. Saeksan Or Kwanmung and Petchuthong Or Kwanmung were the first champions crowd by the organization.

On April 28 2018, Youssef Boughanem from Belgium and Morocco became the first world champion as non-Thai kickboxer. In addition, he was the current WBC Muaythai world Middleweight champion.

Current champions

IBF Muaythai sanctions 17 weight division as same as boxing. This is different from WBC Muaythai as it sanctions 19 weight divisions.

See also
International Boxing Federation
List of IBF Muaythai world champions
List of current world Muaythai champions

References

External links
IBF Muauthai
IBF Muyathai Facebook page

Organizations established in 2017
2017 establishments in Thailand
Professional Muay Thai organizations
Sport in Thailand
Organizations based in Bangkok